The 2012 Challenger La Manche was a professional tennis tournament played on indoor hard courts. It was the 19th edition of the tournament which was part of the 2012 ATP Challenger Tour. It took place in Cherbourg, France between February 27 and March 4, 2012.

ATP entrants

Seeds

 Rankings are as of February 20, 2012.

Other entrants
The following players received wildcards into the singles main draw:
  Pierre-Hugues Herbert
  Romain Jouan
  Josselin Ouanna
  Alexandre Sidorenko

The following players received entry as a special exempt into the singles main draw:
  Jerzy Janowicz
  Evgeny Korolev

The following players received entry from the qualifying draw:
  Daniel Evans
  Roman Jebavý
  Illya Marchenko
  Nicolas Renavand

Champions

Singles

 Josselin Ouanna def.  Maxime Teixeira, 6–3, 6–2

Doubles

 Laurynas Grigelis /  Uladzimir Ignatik def.  Dustin Brown /  Jonathan Marray 4–6, 7–6(11–9), [10–0]

External links
Official Website
ITF Search
ATP official site

Challenger La Manche
Challenger La Manche
2012 in French tennis
February 2012 sports events in France
March 2012 sports events in France